Nacerdine Drid known as Nasser Drid (born 22 January 1957) is a retired Algeria international football player.

Drid spent most of his career playing for Algerian sides USM El-Harrach, USM Bel-Abbès and MC Oran. He played in Morocco, side Raja CA Casablanca between 1988 and 1989. He return in Algeria and finished career in MC Oran till 1990.

Honours

With clubs
 Algerian League champion in 1988 with MC Oran
 2nd in the Algerian League in 1987, 1990 with MC Oran
 CAF Champions League winner in 1989 with Raja CA Casablanca

With the Algerian national team
 3rd in the Africa Cup of Nations 1984 in Cote d'Ivoire and 1988 in Morocco
 Bronze medal in the Pan Arab Games 1985 in Casablanca
 Participation in FIFA World Cup of 1986 in Mexico

External links
  Nacerdine Drid statistics – fifa.com
  Nacerdine Drid statistics – dzfootball

1957 births
Living people
People from Tébessa
Algerian footballers
Algeria international footballers
1986 FIFA World Cup players
1984 African Cup of Nations players
1986 African Cup of Nations players
1988 African Cup of Nations players
Competitors at the 1983 Mediterranean Games
USM El Harrach players
USM Bel Abbès players
MC Oran players
Raja CA players
Botola players
Expatriate footballers in Morocco
Algerian expatriate footballers
Algerian expatriate sportspeople in Morocco
MC Oran managers
Association football goalkeepers
Algerian football managers
Mediterranean Games competitors for Algeria
20th-century Algerian people